Turha is a caste mainly found in Bihar, Jharkhand, East UP and Some parts of West Bengal. They worship Lord Shani dev. They claim to belong to Maharana pratap clan. Their main occupation is to sell and grow agricultural products like fish, fruits, and vegetables and play musical instrument.

History and origin

They are found mainly in Darbhanga and Muzaffarpur, Samastipur -(Dalsingsarai), Begusarai, East & West Champaran, Gopalganj, Siwan, Chapra, Vaishali, districts of Bihar, with a few also found in the neighbouring Terai region of Nepal, eastern U.P., West Bengal and western Bihar, and all over India. They speak Bajjika, Maithili, Bhojpuri and Hindi.

Present circumstances

The Turha caste are divided into a number of lineages known as khandans. Marriages are forbidden within the khandan. The largest khandan is the Palak Turha. They use Sah, Sahu, Shah, Shaw, Prasad, Saw, Sau, Turha, Turaha, Turaiha, and Tura as surnames. They reside all over India and some Turha also stay in Gulf countries and they do their business all over the world.

References

Social groups of Bihar
Social groups of West Bengal
Indian castes